Phragmataecia minima is a species of moth of the family Cossidae. It is found in southern India.

References

Moths described in 1891
Phragmataecia